Siskovsky is a rural locality (a khutor) in Kumylzhenskoye Rural Settlement, Kumylzhensky District, Volgograd Oblast, Russia. The population was 47 as of 2010.

Geography 
Siskovsky is located on the left bank of the Khopyor River, 17 km west of Kumylzhenskaya (the district's administrative centre) by road. Samoylovsky is the nearest rural locality.

References 

Rural localities in Kumylzhensky District